Mikhail Varnakov (born March 1, 1985) is a Russian professional ice hockey forward who is currently playing for HC Lada Togliatti in the Supreme Hockey League (VHL).

Playing career
Varnakov previously played four seasons with Ak Bars Kazan in the Kontinental Hockey League (KHL) before leaving as a free agent to sign a one-year deal with HC Dynamo Moscow on May 12, 2017.

After five seasons away from original club, Torpedo Nizhny Novgorod, Varnakov returned as a free agent on May 31, 2018. Varnakov was soon appointed as team captain for Torpedo prior to the 2018–19 season.

References

External links

1985 births
Living people
Russian ice hockey right wingers
Ak Bars Kazan players
HC Dynamo Moscow players
SKA Saint Petersburg players
Sportspeople from Nizhny Novgorod
Torpedo Nizhny Novgorod players